Johannes Hendrikus ("Jan") Huijgen (7 February 1886 – 20 February 1964) was a Dutch track and field athlete who competed in the 1908 Summer Olympics. He was born in Rotterdam. In 1908 he was eliminated in the first round of the 3500 metre walk competition as well as of the 10 mile walk event.

References

External links
list of Dutch athletes

1886 births
1964 deaths
Dutch male racewalkers
Olympic athletes of the Netherlands
Athletes (track and field) at the 1908 Summer Olympics
Athletes from Rotterdam
19th-century Dutch people
20th-century Dutch people